Bobby Ford (born 14 December 1949) is a Scottish footballer, who played for Falkirk, Dundee, Montrose, Raith Rovers, Dunfermline Athletic and Meadowbank Thistle.

External links

1949 births
Living people
Association football midfielders
Scottish footballers
Falkirk F.C. players
Dundee F.C. players
Montrose F.C. players
Raith Rovers F.C. players
Dunfermline Athletic F.C. players
Livingston F.C. players
Scottish Football League players
Footballers from Edinburgh
Armadale Thistle F.C. non-playing staff